Gregg Wallis (born December 18, 1982) is an American baseball coach and former infielder, who is the current head baseball coach of the Grand Canyon Antelopes. He played college baseball at UC Irvine under Dave Serrano. He held roles on college baseball coaching staffs at UC Irvine, Cal State Fullerton, Tennessee, Grand Canyon and Ohio State before getting his first head coaching opportunity at GCU on July 8, 2022.

High school and college 
Wallis attended Chatsworth High School in Chatsworth, Calif. before playing his college baseball at UC Irvine from 2002 to 2005.

Coaching career 
In 2006, his UC Irvine head coach, Dave Serrano, retained Wallis as an undergraduate assistant coach. He was promoted to director of operations in 2007 and was part of a staff that reached the program's first College World Series.

Wallis moved with Serrano to Cal State Fullerton in 2008, serving as an assistant coach. The Titans qualified for the NCAA Tournament in all three seasons Wallis was on staff, highlighted by a College World Series trip in 2009.

Wallis again followed Serrano to his next stop at Tennessee in 2011, spending three seasons as an assistant coach with the program.

In 2014, Andy Stankiewicz hired Wallis as an assistant coach at Grand Canyon for the program's first season back at the Division I level. Wallis was promoted to recruiting coordinator in 2016.

Following the 2022 season, Bill Mosiello was hired as the new head coach at Ohio State and hired Wallis as his lead assistant and recruiting coordinator.

Stankiewicz departed Grand Canyon for USC on July 3, 2022, and Wallis was hired as Grand Canyon's head coach five days later. Several coveted GCU players who had entered the transfer portal — including shortstop Jacob Wilson who was playing with USA Baseball's Collegiate National Team and 2022 Western Athletic Conference Pitcher of the Year Daniel Avitia — announced their return to GCU within days of Wallis' hiring.

References

External links 

1982 births
Living people
Baseball players from California
UC Irvine Anteaters baseball players
Grand Canyon Antelopes baseball coaches
UC Irvine Anteaters baseball coaches
Cal State Fullerton Titans baseball coaches
Tennessee Volunteers baseball coaches
Ohio State Buckeyes baseball coaches
Chatsworth High School alumni
Baseball coaches from California